These are the squads for the countries that played in the 1922 South American Championship held in Brazil. The participating countries were Argentina, Brazil, Chile and Uruguay. The teams plays in a single round-robin tournament, earning two points for a win, one point for a draw, and zero points for a loss.

Argentina
Head Coach: n/i

Brazil
Head coach:  Laís

Chile
Head Coach:  Juan C. Bertone

Paraguay
Head Coach:  Manuel Fleitas Solich

Uruguay
Head Coach:  Pedro Olivieri

Notes

References 

Squads
Copa América squads